Balukovskaya is a rural locality (a village) in Kumzerskoye Rural Settlement, Kharovsky District, Vologda Oblast, Russia. The population was 19 as of 2002.

Geography 
Balukovskaya is located 54 km northwest of Kharovsk (the district's administrative centre) by road. Andreyevskaya is the nearest rural locality.

References 

Rural localities in Kharovsky District